Ronald Ernest Heckman (23 November 1929 – November 1990) was an English footballer who played as a left winger in the Football League for Leyton Orient, Millwall and Crystal Palace. He later played non-league football for Bedford Town whom he also managed from April 1967 to March 1969.

References

External links

Heckman at holmesdale.net

1929 births
1990 deaths
English footballers
Footballers from Peckham
Association football midfielders
Bromley F.C. players
Leyton Orient F.C. players
Crystal Palace F.C. players
Millwall F.C. players
Bedford Town F.C. players
English Football League players
Southern Football League players
Southern Football League managers
Bedford Town F.C. managers
English football managers